SEST may refer to:

 Swedish-ESO Submillimetre Telescope, a radio telescope located in South America
 The ICAO airport code for San Cristóbal Airport on San Cristóbal Island in Ecuador